National Route 442 is a national highway of Japan connecting Ōita, Ōita and Ōkawa, Fukuoka in Japan, with a total length of 162.2 km (100.79 mi).

References

National highways in Japan
Roads in Fukuoka Prefecture
Roads in Kumamoto Prefecture
Roads in Ōita Prefecture